The 1972 Oregon Webfoots football team represented the University of Oregon in the Pacific-8 Conference during the 1972 NCAA University Division football season. Home games were played in Eugene at Autzen Stadium.

Led by first-year head coach Dick Enright, the Ducks were 4–7 overall (2–5 in Pac-8, tied for sixth), and were outscored 285 to 194. Oregon met five ranked teams and won once. In the Civil War at Parker Stadium in Corvallis, the Ducks broke an eight-game losing streak against Oregon State, beating OSU head coach Dee Andros for the first time in the series. Previously the offensive line coach, Enright was promoted in early February, two weeks after the resignation of Jerry Frei.

Oregon was led on the field by senior quarterback Dan Fouts, a three-year starter who was selected in the third round of the 1973 NFL Draft, 64th overall. He played fifteen seasons in the NFL for the San Diego Chargers and is a member of the Pro Football Hall of Fame.

Schedule

UCLA game was played on Friday night

Roster

Season summary

Oregon State

Oregon's first win over its in-state rival in nine years.

All-conference

Two Oregon seniors were named to the All-Pac-8 team: quarterback Dan Fouts and wide receiver Greg Specht.

NFL Draft

Three Oregon seniors were selected in the draft; center Chuck Bradley (52nd), tackle Tim Stokes (60th), and quarterback Dan Fouts (64th).

List of Oregon Ducks in the NFL draft

References

 McCann, Michael C. (1995). Oregon Ducks Football: 100 Years of Glory. Eugene, Oregon: McCann Communications Corp. .

Oregon
Oregon Ducks football seasons
Oregon Webfoots football